The 1902 Stanford football team represented Stanford University in the 1902 college football season and was coached by Carl L. "Clem" Clemans in his only season coaching the team. Clemans played for Stanford's first football teams and was the team's first captain. He scored the first two touchdowns in the first Big Game against California.

Schedule

Game summaries

California
The Big Game against rival California had been played at five different fields around San Francisco since the first game in 1892. The field used for the previous three games, at 16th and Folsom Streets, had been sold and no new field was immediately identified. A site at a former Jewish cemetery at 18th and Dolores was identified and construction of bleachers began, but at the last moment, one of the organizations that owned the land backed out of the deal.  Just a month before the game was to be played, another site was found in the Richmond District and a field and bleachers were hastily constructed. In the game, Stanford was shut out 16–0, the team's only loss of the season. The 1903 game was also played on this field, and then, beginning with the 1904 Big Game, the game was alternated between the home field of each team.

References

Stanford
Stanford Cardinal football seasons
Stanford football